The succentor ("under-singer") is the assistant to the precentor, typically in an ancient cathedral foundation, helping with the preparation and conduct of the liturgy including psalms, preces and responses. In English cathedrals today, the priest responsible for liturgy and music is usually the precentor, but some cathedrals, such as St Paul's, Southwark Cathedral , Durham, and Christ Church, Oxford, retain a succentor as well. Lichfield used the title subchanter.  Westminster Abbey also retains the tradition; Brecon Cathedral has only a succentor, and no precentor. The succentor is normally a minor canon.

Radley College appears to be unique in having a lay succentor, who is the college organist and assistant to the lay precentor, the director of music.

References

Anglican cathedrals
Anglican church music
Anglican ecclesiastical offices